Christmas in Connecticut is a 1945 American Christmas romantic comedy film about an unmarried city magazine writer who pretends to be a farm wife and mother and then falls in love with a returning war hero. The film was directed by English director Peter Godfrey and stars Barbara Stanwyck, Dennis Morgan and Sydney Greenstreet.

Plot

Elizabeth Lane (Barbara Stanwyck) is a single New Yorker, employed as a food writer. Her articles about her fictitious Connecticut farm, husband, and baby are admired by housewives across the country. Her publisher, Alexander Yardley (Sydney Greenstreet), is unaware of the charade and insists that Elizabeth host a Christmas dinner for returning war hero Jefferson Jones (Dennis Morgan), who read all of her recipes while in the hospital and is so fond of them that his nurse/fiancée Mary Lee (Joyce Compton), wrote a letter to the publisher. Facing a career-ending scandal, not only for herself but for her editor, Dudley Beecham (Robert Shayne), Lane is forced to comply. In desperation, Elizabeth agrees to marry her friend, John Sloan (Reginald Gardiner), who has a farm in Connecticut.  She also enlists the help of her chef friend and "honorary uncle" Felix Bassenak (S. Z. Sakall), who has been providing her with the recipes for her articles.

At Sloan's farm on Christmas Eve, Elizabeth meets Norah (Una O'Connor), the housekeeper, as well as a neighbor's baby whom they pretend is their baby. Elizabeth and John plan to be married immediately by Judge Crothers (Dick Elliot), but the ceremony is interrupted when Jefferson arrives early. Elizabeth is smitten and it is love at first sight.

The judge returns on Christmas morning, but the ceremony is postponed when a different neighbor's baby is presented instead of the one from the day before. The household is alarmed when Felix claims that the baby has swallowed his watch.  After the judge leaves, Uncle Felix admits to Elizabeth that he had lied about the watch to stop the wedding. While the household attends a local dance, the baby's real mother arrives to pick up her baby. Alexander witnesses her leaving with the child and assumes someone is kidnapping the baby. Elizabeth and Jefferson spend the night in jail, charged with stealing a neighbor's horse and sleigh they had accidentally taken a joyride in, and return to the farm early the next morning. Alexander chastises Elizabeth for being out all night and accuses her of neglecting her child. Elizabeth finally confesses all. Furious, Alexander fires her.

Mary Lee arrives unexpectedly. Dejected, Elizabeth retires to pack her things and leave the farm. Felix learns that Mary Lee has already married someone else and must break the engagement. He entices Alexander into the kitchen with the smell of cooking kidneys. He fabricates a story about a competing magazine's attempts to hire Elizabeth, and Alexander decides to hire her back with an increase in salary.  Felix tells Jefferson that he is free to pursue Elizabeth. Elizabeth's packing is interrupted, first by Alexander, and then by Jefferson. After teasing her that he is a cad who woos married women, Jefferson reveals the truth. The couple kiss and plan to marry.

Cast
 Barbara Stanwyck as Elizabeth Lane
 Dennis Morgan as Jefferson Jones
 Sydney Greenstreet as Alexander Yardley
 Reginald Gardiner as John Sloan
 S.Z. Sakall as Felix Bassenak
 Robert Shayne as Dudley Beecham
 Una O'Connor as Norah
 Frank Jenks as Sinkewicz
 Joyce Compton as Mary Lee
 Dick Elliott as Judge Crothers

Production
Principal photography took place from late May to late July 1944. Bette Davis was originally announced in February 1944 as the female lead for the film, but was replaced by Stanwyck in April.  Stanwyck's suitor, played in the film by Reginald Gardiner, was originally to have been played by John Alexander.  Sydney Greenstreet and director Peter Godfrey kept the cast amused on the set during filming. Edith Head designed Barbara Stanwyck's gowns for the film and Milo Anderson designed additional gowns.

Reception
The film was a big hit, earning $3,273,000 domestically and $859,000 in overseas markets. It has  score on Rotten Tomatoes, based on  reviews. Critic Emanuel Levy noted that the film "obviously propagated conservative ideology, sending women to the kitchen to dutifully play their roles as housewives and mothers after tasting some emancipation during the War years."

Radio adaptation
Christmas in Connecticut was presented on Stars in the Air on March 20, 1952. The 30-minute adaptation starred Gordon MacRae and Phyllis Thaxter.

Television adaptation
The Lux Video Theatre presented a one hour version on December 13, 1956 starring Mona Freeman, Ed Kemmer and Roland Winters.

Remake

A remake of Christmas in Connecticut was made in 1992, starring Dyan Cannon as Elizabeth, Kris Kristofferson as Jefferson Jones, and Tony Curtis as Mr. Yardley. The made-for-TV movie, which first aired on TNT, was directed by Arnold Schwarzenegger, who also had a cameo appearance. In this remake, Elizabeth "Blane" is the hostess of her own cooking show. When her manager, Alexander Yardley, introduces her to Jefferson Jones – a forest ranger who lost his cabin in a fire – he asks her to make Jones Christmas dinner live on her show. As in the original, Elizabeth isn't as talented as she seems. This version was not as well-received as the original. As one critic wrote, "You'll be hungry for a better movie after suffering through this film".

See also
 List of Christmas films
 List of American films of 1945

References

External links

 
 
 
 

1945 films
1945 romantic comedy films
American Christmas comedy films
American romantic comedy films
American black-and-white films
Films about writers
Films directed by Peter Godfrey
Films scored by Friedrich Hollaender
Films set in Connecticut
Warner Bros. films
1940s Christmas films
1940s English-language films
1940s American films